El Morell is a village in the province of Tarragona and autonomous community of Catalonia, Spain. The municipality has two exclaves to the west.

References

External links
 Government data pages 

Municipalities in Tarragonès
Populated places in Tarragonès